From the Middle Ages until the Holocaust, Polish Jews comprised an appreciable part of Poland's population.  The Polish–Lithuanian Commonwealth, known for its religious tolerance and described as Paradisus Judaeorum (Latin for "Paradise of the Jews"), had attracted tens of thousands of Jews who fled persecution from other European countries. Poland was a major spiritual and cultural center for Ashkenazi Jews.

At the start of the Second World War, Poland had the largest Jewish population in the world (over 3.3 million, some 10% of the general Polish population).  The vast majority were murdered in the Holocaust in Poland during the Germany occupation, under the Nazi "Final Solution" mass-extermination program. Only 369,000 (11%) of Poland's Jews survived the War.

The list below includes persons of Jewish faith or ancestry.

Historical figures

Politicians
 Menachem Begin (1913–1992), Israeli prime minister, Nobel Laureate, 1978 (born in Poland)
 David Ben-Gurion (1886–1973), Israeli prime minister (born in Poland)
 Naftali Bennett, Israeli prime minister and former software entrepreneur
 Jakub Berman (1901–1984), Polish communist, Secretary of PUWP (Polish United Workers' Party), in charge of State Security Services (Urząd Bezpieczeństwa, UB), the largest and the most notorious secret police force in the history of the People's Republic of Poland,
 Sala Burton (1925–1987), American politician
 Adam Czerniaków (1880–1942), member of Warsaw Municipal Council; Polish Senator; head of the Jewish Council under the Nazi Germans; committed suicide when the Germans requested that the children will be deported
 Ludwik Dorn (b. 1954), Polish politician, a speaker of the Sejm
 Bronisław Geremek, Polish social historian, politician and former Minister of Foreign Affairs
 Barry Goldwater, American politician and businessman
 Shlomo Goren (1917–1994), Chief Rabbi of the Military Rabbinate of the IDF
 Anna Komorowska, First Lady of Poland between 2010 and 2015
 Julian Klaczko (1825–1906), Polish politician
 Agata Kornhauser-Duda, First Lady of Poland from 2015, Jewish grandfather, not Jewish in faith 
 Herman Lieberman, Polish lawyer, politician and former Minister of Justice
 Stefan Meller, Polish diplomat, academician and former Minister of Foreign Affairs
 Adam Michnik, Polish historian, essayist
 David Miliband (b. 1965), British foreign affairs minister
 Ed Miliband, British politician, Leader of the Labour Party and Leader of the Opposition between 2010 and 2015
 Lewis Bernstein Namier (1888–1960), British politician
 Benjamin Netanyahu, Prime Minister of Israel; father was from Warsaw
 Shimon Peres (1923–2016), Israeli prime minister and president, Nobel Prize laureate (1994)
 Adam Daniel Rotfeld, Polish researcher, diplomat, and former Minister of Foreign Affairs
 Yitzhak Shamir (1915–2012), Israeli prime minister (born in Poland)
 Zalman Shazar, Israeli President 1963 to 1973
 Stanisław Stroński (1882–1955), Polish politician (of Jewish descent)
 Jerzy Urban, politician, journalist, editor-in-chief of the weekly NIE
 Samuel A. Weiss (1902–1977), American politician
 Shevah Weiss, political scientist, former Deputy Speaker of the Knesset
 Vladimir Zhirinovsky, Russian politician, founder and the leader of the Liberal Democratic Party of Russia

Others

 Mordechai Anielewicz, leader of Jewish Combat Organization in World War II
 Chajka, mistress of Polish king Stanisław August Poniatowski
 Morris Cohen, aide to Chinese leader Sun Yat-sen
 Icchak Cukierman, leader of the Warsaw Ghetto Uprising and fighter of Warsaw Uprising
 Dora Diamant (1898–1952), lover of Franz Kafka
 Israel Epstein, naturalized Chinese journalist and author
 Anatol Fejgin, commander of the Stalinist political police
 Paweł Finder, leader of the Polish Workers' Party (1943-1944)
 Gaspar da Gama (1444–ca.1510), traveler, interpreter
 Bolesław Gebert, Soviet agent in the United States
 Konstanty Gebert, Polish journalist
 Zofia Gomułkowa, wife of Władysław Gomułka
 Adam Humer, Stalinist official
 Berek Joselewicz, commanded the first Jewish military formation in modern history
 Marion Kozak, political activist and human rights campaigner (Campaign for Nuclear Disarmament, Jews for Justice for Palestinians, Independent Jewish Voices), mother of David and Ed Miliband. 
 Meyer Lansky, American organized crime figure
 Sir Hersch Lauterpacht, British judge
 Rosa Luxemburg (1871–1919), Marxist revolutionary
 John Monash, Australian general
 Walenty Potocki, Polish count who converted to Judaism
 Marcel Reich-Ranicki, German literary critic
 Sonia Rykiel, French fashion designer
 Józef Światło, Stalinist interrogator
 Leopold Unger, journalist, columnist, and essayist
 Ben Weider, Canadian businessman
 Joe Weider, Canadian bodybuilder and entrepreneur
 Janusz Weiss, journalist and television personality
 Helena Wolińska-Brus, Stalinist prosecutor, wife of Włodzimierz Brus
 L. L. Zamenhof, physician, inventor, and writer; creator of Esperanto

Sovereign Polish Armed Forces
 Berek Joselewicz, Polish-Jewish Colonel in the Polish Legions of Napoleon's armies
 Bernard Mond, member of the Austrio—Hungarian Army, 1914–1918; Polish soldier and officer, 1918–1939; sent to POW camp by the Germans; finished his career in the rank of Brigade General and, in command of the 6th Infantry Division (Poland), fought against the Germans in 1939
 Poldek Pfefferberg, Polish soldier in 1939 saved from death by his sergeant major; Holocaust survivor; a man who inspired the book that the film Schindler's List was based on
 Baruch Steinberg, Chief Rabbi of the Polish Armed Forces, murdered by the Soviet NKVD

Religious figures
 Philip Ferdinand, professor of Hebrew
 Christian David Ginsburg (1831–1914), Hebraist, converted to Christianity
 Ridley Haim Herschell (1807–1864), missionary; moved to England

Rabbis
 Rabbi Jacob ben Wolf Kranz, preacher (meggid) from Dubno
 Rabbi Aaron Hart (1670–1756), rabbi
 Rabbi Elijah Ba'al Shem of Chelm (1550-1583), co-signer of the Agunah laws; chief rabbi of Chelm
 Rabbi Menachem Ziemba, Warsaw Rabbinate
 Rabbi Kalonymus Kalman Shapira
 Rabbi Yitzchak Meir Alter (1798 – March 10, 1866), also known as the Chiddushei HaRim. First Gerrer Rebbe
 Rabbi Yehudah Aryeh Leib Alter (1847–1905), also known as the Sfas Emes. Gerrer Rebbe from 1870 to 1905.
 Rabbi Avraham Mordechai Alter (December 25, 1866 – June 3, 1948), also known as the Imrei Emes. Gerrer Rebbe from 1905 to 1948.
 Rabbi Yisrael Alter (October 12, 1895 – February 20, 1977), also known as the Beis Yisroel. Gerrer Rebbe from 1948 to 1977.
 Rabbi Simchah Bunim Alter (April 6, 1898 – August 6, 1992), also known as the Lev Simcha. Gerrer Rebbe from 1977 to 1992.
 Rabbi Pinchas Menachem Alter (June 9, 1926 – March 7, 1996), also known as the Pnei Menachem. Gerrer Rebbe from 1992 to 1996.
 Rabbi Yaakov Aryeh Alter (born 1939), Gerrer Rebbe from 1996 to the present
 Rabbi Chanoch Heynekh HaKohen Levin of Aleksander (1798 – March 21, 1870)
 Rabbi Meir Shapiro (March 3, 1887 – October 27, 1933), rabbi of Lublin, founder of Yeshiva Chachmei Lublin, and creator of Daf Yomi

Academics

Economists 
 Włodzimierz Brus
 Roman Frydman
 Henryk Grossman
 Leonid Hurwicz, Nobel Prize winner (2007)
 Michał Kalecki
 Ludwik Landau
 
 Hilary Minc (1905-1974)
 Paul Rosenstein-Rodan

Mathematicians 
 Nachman Aronszajn
 Herman Auerbach
 Salomon Bochner
 Samuel Dickstein
 Samuel Eilenberg
 Siemion Fajtlowicz
 Salo Finkelstein
 Mark Kac
 Bronisław Knaster
 Włodzimierz Kuperberg
 Kazimierz Kuratowski
 Leon Lichtenstein
 Adolf Lindenbaum
 Szolem Mandelbrojt
 Benoit Mandelbrot
 Edward Marczewski
 Andrzej Mostowski
 Emil Leon Post
 Mojżesz Presburger
 Stanislaw Saks
 Juliusz Schauder
 Hayyim Selig Slonimski
 Hugo Steinhaus
 Alfred Tarski
 Henryk Toruńczyk
 Stanislaw Ulam

Philosophers
 Henri Bergson
 Alain Finkielkraut
 Jan Hartman
 Morris Lazerowitz
 Casimir Lewy
 Mieczysław Maneli
 Émile Meyerson
 Ralph Miliband
 Adam Schaff

Sciences 
 Zygmunt Bauman, sociologist
 Leslie Brent, immunologist 
 Georges Charpak, physicist, Nobel Prize winner (1992)
 Kasimir Fajans, physicist 
 Jan T. Gross, (Christian mother, Jewish father) sociologist and historian
 Ludwik Hirszfeld, microbiologist and scientist
 Roald Hoffmann (born 1937), chemist and writer; Nobel Prize winner (1981)
 Leopold Infeld, physicist 
 Hilary Koprowski, immunologist 
 Abraham Lempel, computer scientist 
 Albert Abraham Michelson (1852-1931), physicist; Nobel Prize winner (1907)
 Itzhak Nener, Jurist
 Moshe Prywes (1914-1998), Israeli physician and educator; first President of Ben-Gurion University of the Negev
 Isidor Isaac Rabi, physicist, Nobel Prize winner (1944)
 Ludwik Rajchman, Polish bacteriologist; first Chairman of UNICEF 
 Tadeus Reichstein, chemist, Nobel Prize winner (1950)
 Józef Rotblat, physicist, nuclear disarmament activist, Nobel Peace Prize winner (1995)
 Albert Sabin, inventor of the oral polio vaccine 
 Paweł Śpiewak, sociologist, historian, politician and director of the Jewish Historical Institute
 Ary Sternfeld, founder of astronautics

Historians
 Szymon Askenazy
 Artur Eisenbach
 Emanuel Ringelblum
 Jacob Talmon (1916-1980), historian; made aliyah to Israel
 Adam Ulam

Cultural figures

Artists
 Adolf Behrman, Polish-Jewish painter
 Henryk Berlewi, painter.
 Alexander Bogen, painter, sculptor, stage designer, book illustrator and a commander partisan during World War II
 Aniela Cukier, Polish-Jewish painter
 Karl Duldig, Polish-Jewish sculptor
 Jacob Epstein, American-British sculptor
 Samuel Finkelstein, Polish-Jewish oil painter
 Enrico Glicenstein, Polish-Jewish-American sculptor
 Chaim Goldberg, Polish-Jewish artist, painter, sculptor and engraver
 René Goscinny, French comics editor and writer
 Itshak Holtz (1925-2018), painter; immigrated to Israel
 Mayer Kirshenblatt (1916-2009), artist
 Paul Kor, Israeli painter, graphic designer, author and illustrator
 Felix Lembersky (1913-1970), painter and theater stage designer
 Arthur Szyk, book illustrator and political artist 
 Feliks Topolski, painter, illustrator, graphic artist 
 Alfred Wolmark (1887-1961), painter; immigrated to England

Musicians
 Arthur Balsam, violinist and pedagogue born in Warsaw and trained in Łódź
 Mike Brant, Israeli pop star; mother was Bronia Rosenberg, originally from Łódź in Poland; father was Fishel Brand, from Biłgoraj in Poland
 Grzegorz Fitelberg, composer and conductor; born in Dvinsk, Latvia
 Jerzy Fitelberg, composer; born in Warsaw, Poland; immigrated to the United States
 Russ Freeman (pianist), bebop jazz pianist and composer; father born in Poland
 Szymon Goldberg, conductor and violinist; born in Włocławek, Congress Poland
 Benny Goodman, band leader; parents born in Poland
 George Henschel (1850-1934), musician; immigrated to England
 Mieczysław Horszowski, pianist, born in Lwow
 Jan Kiepura (1902-1966), actor and singer; immigrated to the United States (Jewish mother)
 Paul Kletzki (1900-1973), composer and conductor
 Slawomir Kowalinski (born 1965), polish pianist and composer
 Wanda Landowska (5 July 1879 - 16 August 1959), harpsichordist
 Geddy Lee vocalist and bassist for Rush (band), (Parents born in Poland)
 Jerzy Petersburski (1895-1979)
 Moriz Rosenthal, pianist, born in Lwow
 Eddie Rosner (26 May 1910 - 8 August 1976)
 Arthur Rubinstein, pianist
 Isaac Stern, violinist
 Henryk Szeryng (1918-1988), violinist; immigrated to Mexico
 Władysław Szpilman, pianist and subject of the Roman Polanski film The Pianist
 Maria Szymanowska, pianist and composer
 Henryk Wars (1902-1977), composer; immigrated to the United States
 Henryk Wieniawski

Screen and stage
 Feliks Falk (born 1941)
 Aleksander Ford (1908-1980), film director
 Joseph Green (1900-1996), Polish-American film actor and director
 Jerzy Hoffman (born 1932), film director and screenwriter
 Agnieszka Holland (born 1948), film director and writer (Jewish father)
 Boris Kaufman (1887-1980), cinematographer; immigrated to the United States; brother of Mikhail Kaufman and Dziga Vertov
 Mikhail Kaufman (1897-1980), cinematographer and photographer; immigrated to the Soviet Union; brother of Boris Kaufman and Dziga Vertov
 Krzysztof Kowalewski (1937-2021), film, television, theatre and radio actor, comedian
 Marcel Łoziński (born 1940)
Andrzej Munk (1921-1961), film director and screenwriter, one of the creators of the Polish Film School
 Roman Polanski (born 1933), Polish-French film director (Jewish father, half-Jewish mother)
 Marie Rambert (1888-1982), ballet dancer and teacher; immigrated to England
 Piotr Skrzynecki, cabaret director (Jewish mother)
 Jerzy Toeplitz (1909-1995), film educator, director, writer
 Konrad Tom (1887-1957), actor, writer, singer and director working in theater and film
 Dziga Vertov, film director; immigrated to the Soviet Union; brother of Boris Kaufman and Mikhail Kaufman
 Michał Waszyński (1904-1965), film and theater director; film producer
Michał Znicz, born Michał Feiertag, (1888-1943), stage and film actor

Writers and poets

Polish-language
 Rokhl Auerbakh, writer and essayist
 Krzysztof Kamil Baczyński
 Roman Brandstaetter, writer and poet
 Kazimierz Brandys (1916-2000), writer
 Marian Brandys, writer and screenwriter
 Jan Brzechwa
Gusta Dawidson Draenger (1917-1943), journalist, diarist
 Zuzanna Ginczanka
 Agnieszka Graff, writer and feminist
 Marian Hemar
 Janusz Korczak, writer
 Henryka Łazowertówna
 Bolesław Leśmian (1877-1937), poet (Jewish ancestry)
 Teodor Parnicki (1908-1988), writer (Jewish mother)
 Tadeusz Różewicz (Jewish mother)
 Bruno Schulz, writer
 Antoni Slonimski
 Anatol Stern (1899-1968), poet
 Robert Stiller (1928-2016), writer and prolific translator into Polish from English, German and other languages
 Władysław Szlengel
 Włodzimierz Szymanowicz (Jewish father)
 Julian Tuwim (1894-1953), poet
 Leopold Tyrmand (1920-1985), writer
 Aleksander Wat (1900-1967), poet
 Józef Wittlin, poet
 Bogdan-Dawid Wojdowski (1930-1994), writer

Yiddish-language
 Sholem Asch (1880-1957), novelist and essayist
 Rokhl Auerbakh (1903-1976), writer and essayist
 Isaac ben Saul Chmelniker Candia (fl. 19th-century)
 Solomon Ettinger (1802-1856), playwright and poet
 Isaac Leib Peretz (1852-1915), author and playwright
 Isaac Bashevis Singer (1902-1991), author
 Abraham Sutzkever (1913-2010), poet, immigrated to Israel
 Aleksander Zederbaum (1816-1893), journalist

Business figures
 Arthur Belfer, founder of the Belco Petroleum Corporation
 Józef Blass
 André Citroën, industrialist, engineer and founder of Citroën
 Max Factor, Sr. (born Maksymilian Faktorowicz), founder of Max Factor & Company; half-brother of Prohibition-era gangster John Factor (born Iakov Faktorowicz)
 Jona Goldrich (born Jona Goldreich), L.A.-based real estate developer
 Samuel Goldwyn (1879-1974; born Szmuel Gelbfisz), founding contributor and executive of several motion picture studios in Hollywood
 Helal Hassenfeld and Henry Hassenfeld, co-founders of Hasbro (originally Hassenfeld Brothers)
 Joanna Hoffman, marketing executive, one of the original members of both the Apple Computer Macintosh team and the NeXT team
 Leopold Julian Kronenberg (1849-1937), banker
 Henry Lowenfeld, impresario, brewer who emigrated to England
 Henry Orenstein (1925-2021), American poker player and entrepreneur
 Samuel Orgelbrand (1810-1896), printer and publisher
 Max Ratner (born Meyer Ratowczer), real estate developer, co-founder of Forest City Enterprises
 Helena Rubinstein (born Chaja Rubinstein), cosmetics entrepreneur, founder and eponym of Helena Rubinstein Incorporated cosmetics company
 Jack Tramiel (1928-2012), businessman and founder of Commodore International
 Warner Bros. (born Wonsal)
 Albert Warner (1884-1967)
 Harry Warner (1881-1958)
 Jack L. Warner (1892-1978)
 Sam Warner (1887-1927)
 Sam Zell (Shmuel Zielonka), billionaire businessman Equity International, lawyer and philanthropist

Sports

Baseball
Moe Drabowsky
 Harry Feldman

Chess

 Izaak Appel
 Abram Blass
 Moshe Czerniak
 Henryk Friedman
 Paulin Frydman
 Miguel Najdorf
 Dawid Przepiórka
 Gersz Rotlewi
 Akiba Rubinstein
 Gersz Salwe
 Siegbert Tarrasch
 Savielly Tartakower (1887-1956)
 Szymon Winawer
 Daniel Yanofsky
 Johannes Zukertort

Fencing

 Roman Kantor, épée, Nordic champion and Soviet champion; murdered by the Nazis

Football

 Ludwik Gintel, Poland national team
 Abraham "Avram" Grant (born 1955), football manager of various football clubs and national teams (e.g. Chelsea F.C., Israel, Ghana national football team)
 Józef Klotz, Poland national team; murdered by the Nazis
 Józef Lustgarten, spent 17 years in the Gulag
 Leon Sperling (1900-1941), left wing, Polish national team; murdered by the Nazis in the Lemberg Ghetto
 Zygmunt Steuermann, centre forward, Polish national team (two matches, four goals); died in December 1941 in the Lemberg Ghetto
 Ben Lederman, American-born, midfield, Raków Częstochowa

Professional wrestling

 Chris Mordetzky, American professional wrestler, known for his time in World Wrestling Entertainment under the ring name Chris Masters

Swimming

 Lejzor Ilja Szrajbman, Olympic 4×200-m freestyle relay; murdered by the Nazis in Majdanek concentration camp

Track and field

 Myer Prinstein, Olympic long-jumper from Szczuczyn, Poland
 Irena Szewińska, sprinter and long jumper; world records in 100-m, 200-m, and 400-m; three-time Olympic champion, plus four medals (for a total of seven Olympic medals)
 Jadwiga Wajs, two world records (discus); Olympic silver and bronze (discus)

Weightlifting

 Ben Helfgott, Polish-born, three-time British champion (lightweight), three-time Maccabiah champion; survived Buchenwald and Theresienstadt; all but one family member was murdered by the Nazis

Holocaust survivors

See also
 History of the Jews in Poland
 Israel–Poland relations
 List of Galician Jews
 List of Jews
 List of people from Galicia (modern period)
 List of Poles

References

 
Lists of Jews by country
Jews
 
Jews
Jews,Polish